The Handicap of Love (German:Das Handicap der Liebe) is a 1921 German silent crime film directed by Martin Hartwig and starring Ferdinand von Alten, Magnus Stifter and Hermann Böttcher. It features the detective character Joe Deebs.

The film's art direction was by Robert Neppach.

Cast
 Ferdinand von Alten as Joe Deebs, Detective  
 Magnus Stifter as Jonathan Walpole  
 Hermann Böttcher as Morris Harryman  
 Gertrude Hoffman as Regina Walpole  
 Oscar Marion as Rodger Cleveland, Herrenreiter  
 Uschi Elleot as Carry Cleveland  
 Alfred Gerasch as O'Brien  
 Karl Harbacher 
 Theodor Burghardt

References

Bibliography
 Grange, William. Cultural Chronicle of the Weimar Republic. Scarecrow Press, 2008.

External links 
 

1921 films
Films of the Weimar Republic
Films directed by Martin Hartwig
German silent feature films
UFA GmbH films
German black-and-white films
German crime films
1921 crime films
1920s German films
1920s German-language films